Eric Johanny Chinga Ferreira (born 31 July 1970) is a Chilean activist of Diaguita descent who was elected as a member of the Chilean Constitutional Convention.

As an indigenous dirigent, he has been critic to Yasna Provoste, former candidate of the Christian Democrat Party (centre-left) in the 2021 Chilean presidential elections.

References

External links
 Profile at Chile Constituyente

1971 births
Living people
Chilean people of Diaguita descent
21st-century Chilean politicians
Members of the Chilean Constitutional Convention
People from Copiapó